Malay Ghosh (Bengali: মলয় ঘোষ) is an Indian statistician and currently a Distinguished Professor at the University of Florida. He obtained a B.S. in 1962 from the University of Calcutta, and subsequently a M.A. in 1964 from the University of Calcutta. Then he moved to the United States to pursue higher academic studies and obtained his Ph.D. degree in 1969 from the University of North Carolina at Chapel Hill, under the supervision of Pranab K. Sen.

Career 
Ghosh was a faculty member at the Indian Statistical Institute in the 1970s before briefly joining Iowa State University.
In 1982 he joined the University of Florida.
Ghosh is well known for his research in nonparametric inference, sequential analysis, decision theory, Bayesian statistics and small-area estimation.
As a recognition of his seminal contributions, Ghosh served from 1996 to 2001 in the United States Census Advisory Committee. He has co-authored two books and more than 250 research publications and is the advisor of over 40 Ph.D. students, including Nitis Mukhopadhyay, Parthasarathi Lahiri and Gauri Sankar Datta.

Honors 
In College Park, Maryland, a conference was held in May 2014 honoring Professor Ghosh.

 Samuel S. Wilks Memorial Award, 2020. American Statistical Association
 Elected Fellow of Institute of Mathematical Statistics
 Elected Fellow of American Statistical Association, 1984
 Lukacs Distinguished Professor 1993-1994

References

External links 
Dr. Ghosh's profile at University of Florida

Living people
1944 births
American statisticians
Indian statisticians
Presidency University, Kolkata alumni
University of Calcutta alumni
Academic staff of the University of Calcutta
University of Florida faculty
University of North Carolina at Chapel Hill alumni
Fellows of the American Statistical Association
20th-century Indian mathematicians
Scientists from Kolkata